There are more than 2,400 caves in Slovakia, of which more than 400 have been explored so far. New caves are being discovered constantly.

Caves open to the public
 caves included in the UNESCO World Heritage Sites list:
Dobšiná Ice Cave (Dobšinská ľadová jaskyňa), Slovak Paradise
Domica, Slovak Karst
Gombasek Cave (Gombasecká jaskyňa), Slovak Karst
Jasovská Cave (Jasovská jaskyňa), Slovak Karst
Ochtinská Aragonite Cave (Ochtinská aragonitová jaskyňa), Slovak Karst
 other public caves:
Belianska Cave, Tatras
Bojnická hradná jaskyňa (literally Bojnice Castle Cave), Bojnice
Brestovská Cave (Brestovská jaskyňa), Western Tatras
Bystrianska Cave (Bystrianska jaskyňa), Low Tatras
Cave of Dead Bats (Jaskyňa mŕtvych netopierov), Low Tatras
out of the Demänová Caves ( long), Low Tatras:
Demänovská jaskyňa Slobody (literally Demänová Cave of Freedom)
Demänovská Ice Cave (Demänovská ľadová jaskyňa)
Driny, Little Carpathians
Harmanecká Cave (Harmanecká jaskyňa), Staré Hory Mountains (Starohorské vrchy)
Važecká Cave (Važecká jaskyňa), Liptov Basin
Krásnohorská Cave (Krásna Hôrka Cave), Slovak Karst 
Stanišovská Cave, Jánska valley
Bad Hole (Jaskyňa zlá diera), Bachureň

Other caves 
Note: The list is incomplete
 Diviačia priepasť (literally Boar Pit Cave), Slovak Karst
 Medvedia jaskyňa (Bear Cave), Slovak Paradise
 Demänová Caves (other than those mentioned above), Low Tatras
 Čertova diera (Devil's Hole), Slovak Karst
 Drienovská jaskyňa (Drienovec Cave), Slovak Karst
 Brázda, Slovak Karst
 Krásnohorská Cave (Krásna Hôrka Cave), Slovak Karst
 Malá železná priepasť (Little Iron Pit Cave), Slovak Karst
 Javorová priepasť (Maple Pit Cave), Low Tatras
 Mesačný tieň (Moon Shadow Cave), High Tatras
 Starý hrad (Old Castle), Low Tatras (the deepest cave in Slovakia)
 Silická ľadnica (Silica Ice Cave), Slovak Karst

See also

List of caves
 Speleology

External links 
Slovak Caves Administration

 
Slovakia
Caves